The Turan Range is a range of mountains in far North-eastern Russia. Administratively it belongs partly to Amur Oblast and partly to the Khabarovsk Krai of the Russian Federation.

History
The range was formerly a remote area, first explored by Peter Carl Ludwig Schwarz during the East Siberian Expedition of 1855. It was mapped by Arseniy Usoltsev together with geological engineer Pyotr Gorlov in 1958.

A railway tunnel of the Baikal–Amur Mainline was built across the range.

Geography
The Turan is a range in northeastern Siberia, located in the southeastern end of Amur Oblast and the southwestern side of Khabarovsk Krai. It is part of the Yankan - Tukuringra - Soktakhan - Dzhagdy group of mountain ranges. Its ridges have a massive look, with rounded mountaintops. 

To the north the mountain chain connects with the Ezop Range (Езоп) and to the west and the southwest lies the Zeya-Bureya Lowland. The Bureya reservoir is located to the south.

Hydrography
The Turan Range divides the catchment area of the Selemdzha River (a tributary of the Zeya River) to the west, and the Bureya River (a tributary of the Amur River) to the east. The Tashina River and the Selemdzha tributaries Ulma and Byssa, have their sources in the range.

Flora and fauna
Dwarf Siberian pine shrub grows in the higher elevations.

The range is part of the original habitat of the Amur cat.

See also
Northeast Siberian taiga
Palearctic realm
Temperate coniferous forest

References

External links
Gorny Journal, 1905

Mountain ranges of Amur Oblast
Mountain ranges of Khabarovsk Krai
Mountain ranges of Russia